Nelly Rosario (born 1972) is a Dominican-American novelist and creative writing instructor in the Latina/o Studies Program at Williams College. She was born in the Dominican Republic and raised in the Williamsburg section of Brooklyn, NY. She earned an SB in civil/environmental engineering from MIT and an MFA in creative writing from Columbia University. She has taught in the Undergraduate Creative Writing Program at Columbia University, the MFA Program at Texas State University, and was a visiting scholar in the Comparative Media/Writing Program at MIT. Her fiction and creative nonfiction work has appeared in various anthologies and journals.

After the debut of her novel Song of the Water Saints, Rosario was described by Julia Alvarez as "a Caribbean Scheherazade."

Awards and honors
 1997: Winner, Hurston/Wright Foundation Award in Fiction
 2001: Named a "Writer on the Verge" by the Village Voice Literary Supplement
 2002: Winner, PEN Open Book Award
 2003: Finalist, Hurston/Wright Legacy Award in Debut Fiction
 2008: Recipient, The Sherwood Anderson Foundation Award for Fiction
2015: Recipient, Creative Capital Award

References

1972 births
Living people
American writers of Dominican Republic descent
Dominican Republic emigrants to the United States
MIT School of Engineering alumni
Columbia University School of the Arts alumni
Texas State University faculty